Oregon Route 51 is an Oregon state highway running between Monmouth, Oregon and an intersection with Oregon Route 22 west of Salem.  OR 51 traverses several highways of the Oregon state highway system: the Monmouth–Independence Highway No. 43 and the Independence Highway No. 193.  The route lies completely within Polk County.  The Independence Highway previously continued south to US 20.

Route description 
OR 51 starts, at its southern terminus, in the city of Monmouth, at an intersection with Oregon Route 99W and Oregon Route 194. It heads due east from there for approximately 2½ miles, reaching the neighboring city of Independence. OR 51 terminates at an intersection with OR 22 near Brunks Corner.

While no significant improvements are planned to OR 51 itself; a proposed project to improve OR 22 includes conversion of the (notoriously dangerous) intersection between OR 51 and OR 22 into a grade-separated interchange.

Major intersections

References

051
Monmouth, Oregon
Transportation in Polk County, Oregon
Independence, Oregon
1932 establishments in Oregon